Edward Yarnold SJ (14 January 1926 – 23 July 2002) was an English Jesuit priest and theologian who was Master of Campion Hall from 1965 to 1972 at the University of Oxford.

Life
Yarnold was born in Kingston-upon-Thames and brought up in Leeds where he attended St Michael's College.

In 1943, Yarnold became a member of the Society of Jesus at St Beuno's, North Wales. He then studied classics at Campion Hall in Oxford and philosophy and theology at Heythrop College. In 1960, he was ordained as a priest and then taught Latin and Greek at his former school, St Michael's. In 1964 he returned to the University of Oxford and from 1965 he held the office of Master of Campion Hall for 12 years until 1972.
He died in Oxford on 23 July 2002.

Functions
 Master of Campion Hall (1965–1972)
 Chairman of the University Faculty Board of Theology
 Oxford Doctor of Divinity
 President of the Catholic Theological Association of Great Britain (1986–1988)
 General editor of the Theology Today series
 Co-editor of The Study of Liturgy
 Member of the Ecumenical Society of the Blessed Virgin Mary

List of works
 The Theology of Original Sin (1971)
 The Awe-Inspiring Rites of Initiation (1972)
 The Study of Liturgy, co-editor (1978)
 They Are in Earnest (1982)
 Eight Days With The Lord (1984)
 The Study of Spirituality, co-editor (1986)
 In Search of Unity (1989)
 Time For God (1991)
 Anglicans and Roman Catholics in Search of Unity, co-editor (1994)

Award
In 1981, Yarnold was awarded the Cross of St Augustine by the Archbishop of Canterbury for his contribution to ecumenism.

References

1926 births
2002 deaths
20th-century English Jesuits
20th-century British Roman Catholic theologians
21st-century English Jesuits
21st-century British Roman Catholic theologians
Masters of Campion Hall, Oxford
People from Kingston upon Thames
Recipients of the Cross of St Augustine
People educated at Mount St Mary's Catholic High School, Leeds